In enzymology, a monogalactosyldiacylglycerol synthase is an enzyme that catalyzes the chemical reaction

UDP-galactose + 1,2-diacyl-sn-glycerol  UDP + 3-beta-D-galactosyl-1,2-diacyl-sn-glycerol

Thus, the two substrates of this enzyme are UDP-galactose and 1,2-diacyl-sn-glycerol, whereas its two products are UDP and 3-beta-D-galactosyl-1,2-diacyl-sn-glycerol.

This enzyme belongs to the family of glycosyltransferases, specifically the hexosyltransferases.  The systematic name of this enzyme class is UDP-galactose:1,2-diacyl-sn-glycerol 3-beta-D-galactosyltransferase. Other names in common use include uridine diphosphogalactose-1,2-diacylglycerol galactosyltransferase, UDP-galactose:diacylglycerol galactosyltransferase, MGDG synthase, UDP galactose-1,2-diacylglycerol galactosyltransferase, UDP-galactose-diacylglyceride galactosyltransferase, UDP-galactose:1,2-diacylglycerol 3-beta-D-galactosyltransferase, 1beta-MGDG, and 1,2-diacylglycerol 3-beta-galactosyltransferase.  This enzyme participates in glycerolipid metabolism.

References

 
 
 
 

EC 2.4.1
Enzymes of unknown structure